Dundee Futsal Club is a Scottish futsal club based in the city of Dundee, who compete in the Scottish Futsal League. The club made history by becoming the first ever SFA Quality Marked Futsal Club in 2014.

History 

Dundee Futsal Club was founded in 2013. The club made history by becoming the first ever SFA Quality Marked futsal club in January 2014 and became Scottish Futsal League Two Champions in May 2014 in the club's first ever season playing futsal.

Colours and badge 

Dundee Futsal Club's colours are Blue and White

Scottish Futsal Super League 

Dundee Futsal Club played their Scottish Futsal League matches at Bells Sports Centre, Perth, ending the season as League Two Champions 2013/14. In season 2014/15 the club moved to the newly created Dundee Regional League under the Scottish Futsal League.

2014/15 saw the Club finish 3rd in the league and were runners Up in the East Region Cup.

2015/16 saw the Club finish 2nd place and make the last 16 of the newly formatted Scottish Futsal Cup.

Scottish Futsal Cup 
Dundee Futsal Club made it to the finals of the Scottish Futsal Cup in their debut season, finishing in third place. The Scottish Futsal Cup returned in 2015-16 with a new format in which the club made it to the last 16 of the competition.

First Team Squad 2016/2017

Honours

Leagues 
 Scottish Futsal League Dundee
 Winners (1) 2016–17
 SFA East Region Summer League
 Winners (B Team) 2016
 Scottish Futsal League Dundee
 Runners Up (1) 2015–16
 Scottish Futsal League Two
 Winners (1) 2013–14

Cups 

 East Region Futsal Cup
 Runners Up  2014–15
 Scottish Futsal Cup
 3rd Place  2013–14

Awards 

 SFLDundee Fair Play Award
 Winner  2015–16

References

External links 
 Dundee Futsal Club - Official Site

Futsal clubs in Scotland
Sport in Dundee
Futsal clubs established in 2013
2013 establishments in Scotland